Kriselda Valderrama-Lobo is an American politician who represents District 26 in the Maryland House of Delegates.

Early life and career
Kriselda Valderrama was born in Washington, D.C. to David Mercado Valderrama, a judge in Prince George's County, Maryland and Maryland State Delegate representing District 26. She is of Filipino ancestry. She graduated from Oxon Hill Senior High School, and earned a Bachelor of Science degree in respiratory therapy from Salisbury University.

In the legislature
Valderrama was sworn into the Maryland House of Delegates on January 10, 2007. Since 2022, she has served as the Deputy Majority Leader of the Maryland House of Delegates.

Committee assignments
 Member, Economic Matters Committee, 2015–present (banking, economic development, science & technology subcommittee, 2015–2018; unemployment insurance subcommittee, 2015–2018; chair, workers' compensation subcommittee, 2021, member, 2015–present; member, business regulation subcommittee, 2019; chair, alcoholic beverages subcommittee, 2022–present, member, 2020–present)
 House Chair, Joint Committee on Workers' Compensation Benefit and Insurance Oversight, 2015–present
 Member, Rules and Executive Nominations Committee, 2021–present
 Member, Judiciary Committee, 2007-15 (juvenile law subcommittee, 2007–2015)
 Deputy Majority Whip, 2011–2018
 Member, Legislative Policy Committee, 2019

Other memberships
 Chair, Bi-County Committee, Prince George's County Delegation, 2017–present (law enforcement & state-appointed boards committee, 2014, vice-chair, 2008–2010, chair, 2011–2014; member, bi-county committee, 2015–present)
 Member, Women Legislators of Maryland, 2007
 Maryland Legislative Asian-American and Pacific-Islander Caucus, 2015–present (1st vice-chair, 2016–2019; chair, 2019–2021)
 Maryland Legislative Transit Caucus, 2019–present

Political positions

Paid family leave
Valderrama introduced legislation during the 2020 legislative session to provide all Maryland workers with up to 12 weeks of paid family leave. The bill was reintroduced in 2022, during which it passed and became law after the General Assembly voted to override Governor Larry Hogan's veto.

National politics
Valderrama endorsed Hillary Clinton for president on April 9, 2016.

Social issues
Valderrama was a co-sponsor of the Civil Marriage Protection Act, a bill to legalize same-sex marriage in Maryland. The bill passed the House of Delegates by a vote of 72-67 and was signed into law by Governor Martin O'Malley on March 2, 2012.

Valderrama introduced legislation in the 2016 legislative session to prohibit employers from excluding women from desirable positions and for employers to retaliate against employees for sharing salary information with co-workers.

Valderrama introduced legislation in the 2018 legislative session to block employers from imposing non-disclosure agreements on workers reporting sexual harassment and require employers with more than 50 workers to disclose information about their records in maintaining harassment-free workplaces. The bill passed and was signed into law on May 16, 2018.

Electoral history

References

Democratic Party members of the Maryland House of Delegates
Living people
Women state legislators in Maryland
American politicians of Filipino descent
American women of Filipino descent in politics
21st-century American politicians
21st-century American women politicians
Asian-American people in Maryland politics
1970 births